Francisco Javier Lambán Montañés (born 1957) is a Spanish politician member of the Spanish Socialist Workers' Party (PSOE) and President of the Government of Aragon since 5 July 2015.

Biography 
Born on 19 August 1957 in Ejea de los Caballeros, he graduated in history at the University of Barcelona.
A member of the Ejea city council since 1983 (he also joined the PSOE that year), he was a member of the provincial deputation between 1991 and 2012. He was elected President of the Provincial Deputation of Saragossa on 15 July 1999. He became the Mayor of Ejea in 2007.

A member of the Aragonese regional legislature, the Cortes of Aragon, since 2011, he obtained a PhD in history at the University of Zaragoza in 2014, reading a thesis titled La reforma agraria en Aragón, 1931-1936.

Voted President of the Government of Aragon by the regional legislature after the 2015 election, Lambán was sworn into office on 5 July 2015 at the Aljafería Palace.

References 

|-

|-

living people
1957 births
Mayors of places in Aragon
Presidents of the Government of Aragon
Members of the Cortes of Aragon
Municipal councillors in the province of Zaragoza
University of Barcelona alumni